The Social Democrats are the sixth-largest political party in the Dáil. The Social Democrats co-leader appoints a team of TDs and Senators to speak for the party on different issues. The Social Democrats have been in opposition since their foundation in 2015 and accordingly, their front bench areas of responsibility broadly correspond to those of Government ministers. The current front bench was announced on 21 July 2020, consisting of TDs.

Social Democrats frontbench

References

External links

Front benches in the Oireachtas